Solomon Alexander Hart  (April 1806 – 11 June 1881) was a British painter and engraver. He was the first Jewish member of the Royal Academy in London and was probably the most important Jewish artist working in England in the 19th century.

Biography
He was born at Plymouth, the son of Samuel Hart (fl. 1785–1830), a Jewish engraver and teacher of Hebrew. After completing his basic education, he was apprenticed to another local engraver. Later, he became the first Jew to enroll at the Royal Academy. While there, he worked in a variety of styles from genre to historical scenes and practiced several engraving and sketching techniques. He especially excelled in miniatures.

In 1826, he débuted at one of the Academy's exhibitions with a portrait of his father. By 1840, he was successful enough to be accepted as a member of the Academy. The following year, he embarked on a study trip to Italy and spent a great deal of time in Florence. In 1854, he was appointed a Professor at the Academy and RA Librarian from 1864-1881.

Although his early works were largely Jewish-themed, his exposure to Italian art (especially the works of Domenico Ghirlandaio in the Ognissanti) added motifs from church and monastery paintings. He also regularly provided illustrations for periodicals such as The Athenaeum and The Jewish Chronicle.

He never married and, in his later years, gradually lost his eyesight, although he continued to paint as long as possible.

Works

The Proposal of the Jews to Ferdinand and Isabella (in order to secure their residence in Spain), 1870.   
 (Sold for £137,542 on 8/3/2018 by Kestenbaum & Co, New York).
 'Othello and Iago' (1855). Exhibited at the Royal Academy Exhibition 1855 and the London International Exhibition 1862. Both the oil and watercolour versions were exhibited at the London International Exhibition and the watercolour is now held at the Victoria & Albert Museum, London.(http://m.vam.ac.uk/collections/item/O1108399/othello-and-iago-watercolour-hart-solomon-alexander/)
 Temple of Jews at Shilo Hannah presenting infant to High Priest (1878) (sold on 16 March 1999 for £43,095 by Sotheby's New York)
 Flee Moham'mad Beg who accompanied horses presented by Ima'm of Muscat to King William IV (sold on 29 May 2000 for £29,000 by Eldreds Plymouth)
 [The Quarrel of] Wolsey and Buckingham (1834)
 Coeur de Lion and Saladin (1835)
 The Young Falconer (1835)
 Sir Thomas More receiving his Father's Blessing (1836)
 Henry I receiving News of the Shipwreck and Death of his Son (1840)
 Milton visiting Galileo in Prison (1847)
 The Feast of the Rejoicing of the Law at the Synagogue in Leghorn, Italy (1850)
 The Three Inventors of Printing (1852)
 Hop Picking (1852)
 Solomon pondering the Flight of Time (1853)
 Columbus (1854)
Study for Othello & Iago(1855)
 Sacred Music (1860)
 Dilettanti (1861)
 Desdemona and Othello (1863)
 Benvenuto Cellini and Francis I (1864)
 The Eve of the Sabbath (1868)
 Portrait of Sir Moses Montefiore (1869)
 Oliver Cromwell and Menasseh Ben Israel (1873)
 Troy Weight (1874)
 A Reminiscene of Ravenna (1875)
 Dinner-Time at Penshurst in 1655 (1876)
 Reflection (1877)
 Perfidy (1878)

References and sources

External links

 
 An artwork after Solomon Hart at the Ben Uri site
ArtNet: More works by Hart.
"This Day in Jewish History: An Artist Who Sought to Connect the 'English' With the 'Jewish' Dies" @ Haaretz

1806 births
1881 deaths
19th-century English painters
English male painters
English engravers
English illustrators
English Orthodox Jews
Jewish painters
Religious artists
British Jews
Royal Academicians
19th-century English male artists